(July 25, 1903 – December 16, 1988) was a Japanese artist. He graduated from the Tokyo University of the Arts western art department in 1927 and had a successful career from early on. During World War II he was often commissioned paintings depicting Japanese military scenes, such as the signing of the British surrender of Singapore, and Japanese infantrymen making their way through high grass fields in Malaysia. He returned to mainstream painting following the war, and painted until his death. His work was also part of the painting event in the art competition at the 1936 Summer Olympics.

See also
Iku Takenaka

References

1903 births
1988 deaths
Tokyo School of Fine Arts alumni
People from Kobe
Japanese war artists
World War II artists
20th-century Japanese painters
Olympic competitors in art competitions